This article lists the discography of American blues and rock singer and songwriter Bonnie Raitt.

Albums

Studio albums

Live albums

Compilation albums

Singles

Other charted songs

Other appearances

Music videos

Notes

References

Discography
Blues discographies
Discographies of American artists
Rock music discographies